Bodour Osman Abu Affan (c.1942-2010) was a Sudanese development economist and women's rights activist.

Life
Bodour Osman Abu Affan was born into an affluent Wad Medani family, and educated at Omdurman High School for Girls. After marrying Fareed Atabani, another economist, she studied for her master's degree at the American University in Washington, D.C. while bringing up their two children. She spent a year at the University of California, Berkeley before gaining her PhD from the University of Khartoum in 1984.

She became director of the Social and Economic Research Council in Khartoum and was the first female vice-president of the African Development Bank in Abidjan, Ivory Coast. Together with Raja Hassan Khalifa, she led the campaign of the National Union of Sudanese Women to secure 25% of the seats for women in the next parliament.

She died of cancer aged 67 in 2010.

Works
 The impact of direct private foreign investment on the future development of the Sudan economy, 1980
 Industrial policies and industrialization in the Sudan, 1985
 Traffic and public transport in metropolitan Khartoum : problems and possibilities, 1985

References

1940s births
Year of birth uncertain
2010 deaths
Sudanese economists
Women economists
Development economists